The following is a Mackerras pendulum for the 2019 New South Wales state election.

"Safe" seats require a swing of more than 10 points to change, "fairly safe" seats a swing of 6–10 points, and "marginal" seats less than 6 points.

All margins are Coalition vs. Labor unless specified otherwise.

References

Pendulums for New South Wales state elections